Iepe B. T. Rubingh (17 August 1974 – 8 May 2020) was a Dutch performance artist, athlete and the founder of chess boxing and World Chess Boxing Organisation (WCBO, with central Berlin, Germany in 2003).

Biography

Works as an artist
As a performance artist, Rubingh blocked off intersections in Berlin and Tokyo (Shibuya Crossing) to create major traffic congestion. He was jailed for 10 days for the Tokyo action.

In 2010 (Sunday April), 500 litres of waterbased environmentally-friendly paint on asphalt spread by 2000 cars on Rosenthaler Platz Berlin. By IEPE & the anonymous crew. Directed by AKIZ.

Chess boxing
Rubingh founded chess boxing in 2003, drawing inspiration from Enki Bilal's comic book Froid Équateur. He was the President of the World Chess Boxing Organisation (WCBO) for many years and CEO of Chess Boxing Global, the marketing company for professional chessboxing.

In 2020 (14.05.2020) the leading chess news site ChessBase (Germany), publisher of professional chess literature and owner of the Playchess site (approx. 275,000 registered users, data for 2020) published detailed biographical data about the artist and the athlete Iepe Rubingh, as well as his active work, with which he stood out throughout his life.

The official Facebook page of Iepe Rubingh shows his activity career in detail.

In official web site of Iepe Rubingh, he explains clear his vision about "Entrepreneurship", "Sport" and Art / "Innovation".

The Queen's Gambit
The popular Netflix miniseries "The Queen's Gambit" is dedicated to Rubingh.  He is credited as an "On-Set Chess Consultant" for the series.

Death
Rubingh died in his sleep. The cause of death is not known, except it was not COVID-19.

Record

|-  style="background:#CCFFCC;"
| 2010-11-06 || Win ||align=left| Tim "Bavarian Beast" Yilmaz || Festsaal Kreuzberg || Berlin, Germany || Check Mate || 7 || 
|-
! style=background:white colspan=9 |
|-
|-  style="background:#CCFFCC;"
| 2004-04-17 || Win ||align=left| Soichiro "The Cho-Yabai" Yanase || The Tokyo Fight || Meguro, Tokyo, Japan || Check Mate || 9 || 
|-  style="background:#CCFFCC;"
| 2003-11-14 || Win ||align=left| Luis "The Lawyer" Veenstra || 1st Chess Boxing World Championship || Paradiso, Amsterdam, Netherlands || Time Out || 11 || 
|-
! style=background:white colspan=9 |
|-
|-
| colspan=9 | Legend:

Titles
1st World Chess Boxing Organization World Middleweight champion (2003 – Current)
1st Chess Boxing Club Berlins International German middleweight champion

Official in Guinness World Records: First Chess Boxing World Champion 
The President of WCBO Iepe Rubingh official is recorded in Guinness World Records as the First Chess Boxing World Champion.

References

External links

1974 births
2020 deaths
Dutch performance artists
Entertainers from Rotterdam
Chess boxers
Dutch chess players
Dutch male boxers
Sportspeople from Rotterdam